Susan Katz is an American Paralympic wheelchair basketball player. She has won a gold medal at the 2004 Summer Paralympics. She was previously a producer at ESPN.

Early life
Katz was born in Olney, Maryland with mild spina bifida but later moved to California. At the age of ten, her legs became paralyzed after a failed spinal cord surgery. While her parents encouraged her to walk with crutches and braces, she insisted on using a wheelchair. Katz later attended Quince Orchard High School and the University of Illinois, where she played on the wheelchair basketball team.

Career
Katz qualified for the 1996 Summer Paralympics where she competed in discus, javelin and shot put. After qualifying for the U.S. Paralympics Women's Wheelchair Basketball Team in 2004, Katz was a member of the team that won the gold medal at the Paralympic Games in Athens. Over six games on the way to the gold medal, she played 72 minutes and collected 10 points and 17 rebounds.

Upon retiring, Katz became the director of Paralympic and Disability Sport, World Sport Chicago. She also worked with sports network ESPN as an associate producer of their show Around the Horn and production assistant for SportsCenter. In 2013, Katz become the first American woman handcyclist to complete the Ironman World Championship.

References

External links
Paralympic profile

Living people
Basketball players from Maryland
People from Olney, Maryland
American women's wheelchair basketball players
Paralympic wheelchair basketball players of the United States
Paralympic gold medalists for the United States
Medalists at the 2004 Summer Paralympics
Year of birth missing (living people)
Paralympic medalists in wheelchair basketball
Wheelchair basketball players at the 2004 Summer Paralympics
21st-century American women